Flor is the surname of:

 Cândida Branca Flor (1949–2001), Portuguese entertainer and traditional singer
 Claus Peter Flor (born 1953), German orchestra conductor
 Harold Henry Flor (1900–1991), American plant pathologist known for rust genetics
 Maria Flor (born 1983), Brazilian actress
 María Teresa Torró Flor (born 1992), Spanish tennis player
 Pierre Flor (1775–1848), Norwegian politician and editor
 Vicente Flor (born 1987), Spanish football goalkeeper
 Vicente Amador Flor (1903–1975), Ecuadorian poet

See also
 Tristan Flore (born 1995), French table tennis player